The 2007 All-Africa Games football tournament was held in Algiers, Algeria between 10–23 July 2007 as part of the 2007 All-Africa Games and featured both a men's and women's African Games football tournament.
The men's tournament featured eight (8) teams, the women's six (6). The women's Final match was played on July 22, 2007; the men's on July 23, 2007.

Medal summary

Results

Medal table

References

External links
Men's tournament - rsssf.com
Women's tournament - rsssf.com

 
2007
2007 All-Africa Games
All-Africa Games
All
All